Consumer protection in the United Kingdom is effected through a multiplicity of Acts of Parliament, statutory instruments, government agencies and departments and citizens' lobby groups and aims to ensure the market economy produces fairness and quality in goods and services people buy. The main areas of regulating consumer affairs include,

fairer terms in contracts for goods and services, by declaring surprising and onerous terms as unfair
product safety regulation, to ensure people cannot purchase goods that are potentially harmful
financial regulation, to ensure access to credit is cheaper and people fully understand the obligations they have when taking loans
stronger competition in the private sector, through breaking up cartels, dismantling monopolies and unwinding some mergers

History

English tort law
English contract law
Restraint of trade
Bank of England est 1694
Trading Standards Institute, formerly the Incorporated Society of Inspectors of Weights and Measures est 1881
European Communities Act 1972
Department of Trade and Industry
Department of Prices and Consumer Protection

Regulatory enforcement
Consumer Protection issues are dealt with when complaints are made to the Director-General of Fair Trade. The Office of Fair Trading will then investigate, impose an injunction or take the matter to litigation. However, consumers cannot directly complain to the OFT. Complaints need to be made to Consumer Direct who will provide legal advice to complainants, or re-direct the individual complaint to Trading Standards for investigation. Due to restrictions within the Enterprise Act 2002, individual complainants are unable to be told whether their case is being investigated or not. In very rare cases, Consumer Direct may direct a very large number of complaints to the OFT to be considered as a systemic complaint. The OFT can also be engaged by consumer groups e.g. Which? or the statutory consumer protection body - Consumer Focus - via a super complaint. The OFT rarely prosecute companies, however, preferring a light touch regulation approach. Consumer complaints against companies are not published, but investigation work, undertakings and enforcements are located at. Many of the consumer protection laws e.g. Distance Selling Regulations 2000 or Unfair Terms in Consumer Contracts Act 1997 are actually UK implementations of EU directives. The OFT is one of the bodies responsible for enforcing these rules. This leads to a problem in that these examples of legislation are clearly designed to deal with individual complaints but the OFT will only deal with systemic complaints and will ignore individual complainants redirecting them back to Consumer Direct. The Office of Fair Trading also acts as the UK's official consumer and competition watchdog, with a remit to make markets work well for consumers, and at a local, municipal level by Trading Standards departments. General consumer advice can be obtained from Consumer Direct or via a local branch of the Citizen's Advice Bureau.

Office of Fair Trading
Financial Services Authority, to be replaced in part by the Financial Conduct Authority
Competition Commission
Bank of England
European Commission

Consumer advocacy groups
The Enterprise Act 2002 allows consumer bodies that have been approved by the Secretary of State for Trade and Industry to be designated as "super-complainants" to the Office of Fair Trading. These super-complainants are intended to, "strengthen the voice of consumers," who are "unlikely to have access individually to the kind of information necessary to judge whether markets are failing for them." Eight have been designated :

 CAMRA - a lobbying group concerned with the tradition and quality of beer.
 The Citizen's Advice Bureau, a free service that provides legal advice, practical help and information on consumer rights across the country.
 Consumer Council for Water (formerly known as Watervoice)
 Consumer Direct
 General Consumer Council of Northern Ireland
 Good Garage Scheme, an automobile repair shop motoring scheme
 National Consumer Council
 Postwatch
 Which? - formerly the Consumers Association - a consumer advocacy organisation which has substantial powers (for example to take representative actions under the Competition Act 1998) but which is primarily a lobbying organisation funded entirely by subscriptions to its regular consumer information magazine.

Fundraising - Charity fundraisers on the street or calling house-to-house are sometimes called 'chuggers' - a portmanteau of charity muggers. Some charity fundraisers have been shown to use intimidatory and aggressive tactics, violating rules set out by regulatory agencies.
 Public Fundraising Regulatory Association
 Fund Raising Standards Board

Fair contract terms

Consumer Direct
Unfair Contract Terms Act 1977
Sale of Goods Act 1979
Unfair Terms in Consumer Contract Regulations 1999
Consumer Protection (Distance Selling) Regulations 2000
Electronic Commerce Regulations 2002
Consumer Protection from Unfair Trading Regulations 2008
Unfair Contract Terms Bill
Consumer Rights Act 2015 - in particular Part 2 (Unfair Terms), sections 61 - 69.

Product safety

Consumer Protection Act 1987
General Product Safety Regulations 2005

Finance and credit

Consumer Credit Act 1974
Financial Services and Markets Act 2000
Financial Services Act 2010
Financial Ombudsman Service

Competition law

Competition Act 1998
Enterprise Act 2002

See also
English contract law
UK company law
UK competition law

Notes

References

 
United Kingdom contract law